"Until..." is a waltz/ballad song written and performed by Sting, from the 2001 Academy Award-nominated and Golden Globe-winning film Kate & Leopold. The song won the Golden Globe Award for Best Original Song and was nominated for the Academy Award in the same category.

References

2001 songs
Songs written by Sting (musician)
Sting (musician) songs
Best Original Song Golden Globe winning songs